Anna Sergeyevna Chernysheva (born 29 September 2001) is a Russian karateka. She won the gold medal in the women's 55 kg event at the 2021 European Karate Championships held in Poreč, Croatia. She also won one of the bronze medals in the women's 55 kg event at the 2021 World Karate Championships held in Dubai, United Arab Emirates.

Career 

Chernysheva took up karate in 2010, and in 2018 won the silver medal in the girls' 59 kg event at the Summer Youth Olympics held in Buenos Aires, Argentina.

She qualified at the World Olympic Qualification Tournament in Paris, France to compete at the 2020 Summer Olympics in Tokyo, Japan. At the Olympics, she tested positive for COVID-19, and hence withdrew from the competition.

Achievements

References

External links 
 

Living people
2001 births
Sportspeople from Tolyatti
Russian female karateka
Karateka at the 2018 Summer Youth Olympics
21st-century Russian women